Kakinada revenue division (or Kakinada division) is an administrative division in the Kakinada district of the Indian state of Andhra Pradesh. It is one of the two revenue divisions in the district which consists of twenty one mandals under its administration. Kakinada city is the divisional headquarters.

Mandals 
The mandals in the division are

See also 
List of revenue divisions in Andhra Pradesh
List of mandals in Andhra Pradesh

References 

Revenue divisions in Kakinada district